Dennis Olson (born  November 9, 1934) is a Canadian former professional ice hockey player who played three games in the National Hockey League with the Detroit Red Wings during the 1957–58 season. The rest of his career, which lasted from 1954 to 1965, was spent in the minor leagues.

Career statistics

Regular season and playoffs

External links
 

1934 births
Living people
Canadian ice hockey centres
Detroit Red Wings players
Edmonton Flyers (WHL) players
Ice hockey people from Ontario
Kitchener Beavers (EPHL) players
New Westminster Royals (WHL) players
Seattle Americans players
Sportspeople from Kenora
Springfield Indians players
Trois-Rivières Lions (EPHL) players
Vancouver Canucks (WHL) players